Mel Deane (born 16 January 1975) is a former rugby union footballer who played centre for Connacht, Harlequins and Sale Sharks and Richmond.

Mel Deane has represented Ireland A and was also part of the Ireland squad that toured New Zealand in 2002, but was ultimately never capped at senior level.

Mel retired after the 2007/2008 season finishing his career at Connacht.

Mel is now a professional fitness consultant in South West London.

References

External links
Connacht profile
Harlequins profile

1975 births
Living people
Irish rugby union players
Sale Sharks players
Harlequin F.C. players
Connacht Rugby players
Richmond F.C. players